Freddy Krueger (born May 3, 1975) is a World Championship water skier best known for water ski jumping.  He currently holds the world jumping record at 312 feet.

Tournament results

Masters
 1999 Masters Jump Champion
 2000 Masters Jump Champion
 2001 Masters Jump Champion
 2005 Masters Jump Champion
 2006 Masters Jump Champion
 2007 Masters Jump Champion
 2008 Masters Jump Champion
 2009 Masters Jump Champion
 2010 Masters Jump Champion
 2011 Masters Jump Champion
 2013 Masters Jump Champion
 2016 Masters Jump Champion
 2018 Masters Jump Champion
 2021 Masters Jump Champion

World championships
 2001 World Jump Runner-up
 2003 World Jump Champion
 2007 World Jump Champion
 2009 World Jump Champion
 2011 World Jump Champion
 2013 World Jump Champion

Nationals
 2021 National Jump Champion
 2020 National Jump Champion
 2019 National Jump Champion
 2018 National Jump Champion
 2014 National Jump Champion
 2013 National Jump Champion
 2011 National Jump Champion
 2010 National Jump Champion
 2008 National Jump Champion
 2001 National Jump Champion
 2000 National Jump Champion
 1995 National Jump Champion
 1995 National Overall Champion
 1994 National Trick Runner-up
 1994 National Jump Runner-up
 1994 National Overall Champion

Other tournaments
 2010 Global Invitational – Men's Jumping Champion

See also
 Waterskiing
 World water skiing champions
 Barefoot skiing
 USA Water Ski
 United States Waterskiing Team

References

American water skiers
Living people
1975 births
People from Decatur, Illinois
People from Winter Garden, Florida
Male professional water skiers
Pan American Games medalists in water skiing
Pan American Games gold medalists for the United States
Water skiers at the 1999 Pan American Games
Water skiers at the 2003 Pan American Games
Medalists at the 2003 Pan American Games